Unfinished Business: Paul Keating's interrupted revolution is a non-fiction economic/political book, by David Love. It won the 2009 Gleebooks Prize for critical writing.

It is his account of the prime ministership of Australia of Paul Keating.

Reviews

Bibliography
Unfinished Business: Paul Keating's Interrupted Revolution Scribe Publications, 2009, 
; Scribe Publications Pty Ltd., 2010,

References

External links
Unfinished Business: Paul Keating's Interrupted Revolution (PART 3)
http://www.polanimal.com.au/viewtopic.php?f=5&t=519

2009 non-fiction books